Salisbury School is an all-boys, private college-preparatory boarding school founded in 1901 and located in Salisbury, Connecticut. Its school newspaper is The Cupola. Its mascot is the Crimson Knight. The school's motto is Esse quam videri, which translates as To be rather than to seem to be.

In 2015, Business Insider ranked it the most expensive private high school in the United States.

Sports 
The school has thirty-three interscholastic sports teams.

Hockey
The Salisbury hockey program won the NEPSIHA championship six times in the last 10 years to 2015, including three consecutive years from 2013–2015. Salisbury was the state runner-up in 2018.

Baseball
In May 2015, the team captured its fourth consecutive WNEPBL championship, and fifth in six years. The team also won the WNEPBL title in 2018.

Football
In November 2010, the football team won the 2010 Tom Flaherty Bowl with a 100-yard blocked field goal return. In November 2012, the football team won the Tom Flaherty Bowl and the Class A New England Football title with an undefeated season. The team were state runner-ups in 2015.

Facilities
Salisbury's facilities include:

Flood Athletic Center, completed in 2009 (110,000 square feet of playing space)
The Class of 1959 Hockey Arena which includes the Rudd Rink, an Olympic-sized surface
Two championship basketball courts
The Harris Squash Center (8 ASB courts)
The Mead Wrestling Room
Two weight-training and fitness centers
Locker rooms for all faculty and students and visiting teams
    
Other facilities include The Curtis Boathouse on Lake Washinee, completed in 2008, and dedicated on May 11, 2012 to Richard I. Curtis, instructor and long-time crew coach at Salisbury; eight tennis courts; the Class of 2003 dome used for indoor tennis, lacrosse and other sports; the Natalie Gardner Baseball Field; and five all-purpose athletic fields.    
    
The Wachtmeister Turf Field has lights for night play and stadium seating for 500.

Notable alumni

Prince Ali bin Al Hussein (1993) - Brother of King Abdullah II of Jordan; Vice-President, Federation Internationale de Football (FIFA)
Mark Arcobello (2006) - Professional hockey player, US Olympic Team, 2018
Christopher Atkins (1980) - Actor, The Blue Lagoon, The Pirate Movie, A Night in Heaven, and others
Alex Biega (2006) - Professional hockey player, Vancouver Canucks, NHL
Peter Bohlin (1955) - Architect; designer of Apple retail stores worldwide.
Josiah Bunting III (1957) - Educator and author; retired superintendent of Virginia Military Institute
Paul Carey (2007) - Professional hockey player, New York Rangers, NHL
Porter Collins (1993) - US Olympic oarsman 1996/2000; three-time World Champion 1995/1998/ 1999
John E. Herlitz (1960) - Automotive Designer - Chrysler Senior VP Product Design 
Elliot Hovey (2002) - US Olympic oarsman, 2008/2012
Jay Kemmerer (1966) - Owner, Jackson Hole Mountain Ski Resort
Thomas Kiefer (1976) - US Olympic Silver Medalist oarsman, 1984
Evan Kirk (2007) - Professional lacrosse player, Saskatchewan Rush, 2018
 Patrick Mazeika (born 1993) - baseball player
Harold McGraw III (1968) - Chairman of the Board, McGraw Hill Financial
Brodie Merrill (2001) - Professional lacrosse player, Boston Cannons and Toronto Rock
DA Pennebaker (1942) – Documentary filmmaker
William B. Ruger (1933) - Co-founder, Sturm, Ruger & Co., preeminent US firearm manufacturing company
Matthew Swift (2006) – Co-founder, Chairman, and CEO of the Concordia Summit
Will Toffey (2014) - professional baseball player
Will Tye (2010) - Professional football player, New England Patriots, NFL
Björn Werner (2010) - Professional football player, Indianapolis Colts, NFL 2013-2015
G. Mennen "Soapy" Williams (1929) - Governor of Michigan; Michigan Supreme Court Chief Justice

References

External links
 

Salisbury, Connecticut
Schools in Litchfield County, Connecticut
Boarding schools in Connecticut
Preparatory schools in Connecticut
Private high schools in Connecticut
Boys' schools in the United States
1901 establishments in Connecticut
Educational institutions established in 1901